Vere Brabazon Ponsonby, 9th Earl of Bessborough,  (27 October 1880 – 10 March 1956), was an Anglo-Irish businessman and politician who served as Governor General of Canada, the fourteenth since Canadian Confederation.

Born and educated in England into 'the Ascendancy', the Anglo-Irish aristocracy, he graduated with a law degree from Cambridge University. In 1910 he became a member of the London County Council as a member of the British House of Commons. Upon the death of his grandfather ten years later, Ponsonby succeeded as Earl of Bessborough and took his seat in the House of Lords. In 1931 he was appointed as Governor-General by King George V, on the recommendation of British prime minister Ramsay MacDonald, to replace The Earl of Willingdon as viceroy. He occupied the post until succeeded by The Lord Tweedsmuir in 1935. Lord Bessborough is remembered for promoting new communication technologies as well as giving support to Canadians during the Great Depression.

After the end of his viceregal tenure, he returned to London, where he continued in business and worked with the Dominions Office and the Foreign Office before his death in March 1956.

The 9th Lord Bessborough was the last Earl of Bessborough to own Bessborough House, the Ponsonby family's ancestral seat near the village of Piltown in the south of County Kilkenny in Ireland. The country house was primarily built in the 1740s for the 1st Earl. It was gutted by fire during the Irish Civil War in February 1923. The 9th Lord Bessborough had the house rebuilt in the late 1920s. However, he sold the house in the late 1930s as he primarily lived in Britain. The house now forms the central part of Kildalton Agricultural College.

Early life, education, and career
Ponsonby was born in London, the first son and third child of Edward, 8th Earl of Bessborough, and his wife, Blanche. Her father, Sir Josiah Guest, was a great-uncle of Sir Winston Churchill. Ponsonby attended Harrow School before going up to Trinity College, Cambridge, in 1898, graduating three years later with a Bachelor of Arts degree. In 1903, he began a career in law, being called to the Bar at the Inner Temple. After his father succeeded as Earl of Bessborough in 1906, Ponsonby used the courtesy title of Viscount Duncannon.

In 1907, the young Viscount Duncannon (as he then was) entered politics, being elected to a seat on the London County Council. He remained at that post until running in the January 1910 general election and winning a seat in the British House of Commons as the Member of Parliament (MP) for Cheltenham. He lost that seat in the election of 19 December that same year, but re-entered the Commons in 1913 as the MP for Dover.

Lord Duncannon married Roberte de Neuflize on 25 June 1912. Together they  had four children:
 Frederick (29 March 1913 – 5 December 1993),
 Desmond (4 August 1915 – 8 April 1925), did not live past the age of 10, dying on 8 April 1925 from a riding accident,
 Moyra (2 March 1918 – 4 December 2016),
 George (14 August 1931 – 16 May 1951), born in Canada and given the middle name St. Lawrence (after the river), would also predecease his father on 16 May 1951.

When the First World War broke out and, while retaining his parliamentary seat, Lord Duncannon joined the army. He was commissioned as a second lieutenant in Royal Buckinghamshire Yeomanry. On 11 November 1914, he transferred to the Suffolk Hussars (both units were part of the Territorial Force and were sent into action overseas), where he was later appointed captain and promoted to acting major. He served at Gallipoli in 1915 and, from 1916 to 1918, on the military staff in France. During his wartime service, he was mentioned in dispatches, awarded the Croix de chevalier of the French Legion of Honour, and appointed to the Italian Order of St Maurice and St Lazarus, the Belgian Order of Leopold II, Greece's Order of the Redeemer, as well as a Third Class Member of the Russian Order of St Anna. After the war, Lord Duncannon was appointed a Companion of the Order of St. Michael and St. George in the 1919 New Year Honours List.

After the death of his father on 1 December 1920, he succeeded to the Irish earldom of Bessborough, requiring him to resign his seat in the House of Commons and enter the House of Lords. On 17 December, he applied to be Crown Steward and Bailiff of the Three Hundreds of Chiltern. The Earl had a successful business career, holding directorships in several large commercial firms, including acting as head of both the São Paulo Railway and the Margarine Union, as well as deputy chairman of De Beers Consolidated Mines.

Governor General of Canada
It was announced in early 1931 that King George V had, by commission under the royal sign-manual and signet, appointed Lord Bessborough as his representative. The appointment was made on the recommendation of British prime minister Ramsay MacDonald, with input from Prime Minister of Canada Richard Bennett. It came as somewhat of a surprise, as Bessborough was the only businessman to have ever been appointed Governor General.

After being admitted into the Privy Council of the United Kingdom on 20 March 1931, Lord Bessborough travelled to Canada and was sworn in as Governor General on 4 April, amid the Great Depression. In his travels around Canada, Bessborough witnessed the struggles of Canadians during the depression. He praised their tenacity. In Shawbridge, Quebec, he stated in a speech: "There is nothing more encouraging and cheering than the calm steady way Canadians have pursued their daily tasks during the difficult period with a supreme faith in the destiny of their country". As a sign of his sympathy with the majority of the populace, he gave up 10% of his salary.

Despite the economic situation, Canada was gaining international stature, and Lord Bessborough acted as host to the leaders who, in July 1932, converged on Ottawa for the Imperial Economic Conference. He also presided over the opening of the Welland Canal the same year. The Governor General welcomed many foreign dignitaries, including Prince Takamatsu and his wife, Princess Takamatsu; King Rama VII of Siam and his consort, Queen Ramphaiphanni; and Winston Churchill, then a British Member of Parliament. Several technological firsts took place during Bessborough's tenure: his installation ceremony was the first to be broadcast by radio; in 1932, from the Governor General's study at Rideau Hall, he inaugurated the first trans-Canada telephone line by calling each of the lieutenant governors; and, as Governor-in-Council, he created the Canadian Broadcasting Corporation (the CBC). Lord Bessborough was also the first Canadian viceroy to fly the new standard dedicated to that office, created in 1931.

Bessborough's time as Governor General coincided with the King's Silver Jubilee celebrations in May 1935.  During the celebrations, he launched the King's Jubilee Cancer Fund with a radio broadcast from Rideau Hall. Also, he initiated a campaign to increase the membership of the Scouts. However, the most prominent mark that Bessborough left in Canada was the Dominion Drama Festival.  He developed the festival with the assistance of future Governor-General Vincent Massey and Henry C. Osborne.  The festival was first held in April 1933 and awarded the Bessborough Trophy to the best amateur theatrical company in the country.

Post-viceregal life

After life in Canada, Lord Bessborough returned to London and his businesses. His activities were not all business related. During the Second World War, Bessborough helped establish a department in the British Foreign Office dedicated to the welfare of French refugees in the United Kingdom.

In 1956, the Earl returned once more to Canada, staying at Rideau Hall as a guest of the then-Governor General, Vincent Massey. He died the following year at the country house he purchased in 1924, Stansted House.

Honours

Appointments

  1 January 1919 – 13 February 1931: Companion of the Most Distinguished Order of Saint Michael and Saint George (CMG)
  13 February 1931 – 10 March 1956: Knight Grand Cross of the Most Distinguished Order of Saint Michael and Saint George (GCMG)
  20 March 1931 – 10 March 1956: Member of His Majesty's Most Honourable Privy Council (PC)
  22 June 1934 – 10 March 1956: Knight of Justice of the Most Venerable Order of Saint John (KStJ)
  4 April 1931 – 2 November 1935: Chief Scout for Canada
  4 April 1931 – 2 November 1935: Honorary Member of the Royal Military College of Canada Club

Medals
  1919: 1914–15 Star
  1919: British War Medal
  1919: Victory Medal
  1935: King George V Silver Jubilee Medal
  1937: King George VI Coronation Medal

Foreign honours

  25 September 1917: Croix de Chevalier, Legion of Honor
  17 October 1917: Member, Third Class with Swords of the Order of St. Anna
  24 October 1919:  Officer, Order of the Redeemer
 : Member of the Order of St. Maurice and St. Lazarus
 : Member of the Order of Leopold II
 : Médaille de la Reconnaissance française

Honorary military appointments
  4 April 1931 – 2 November 1935: Colonel of the Governor General's Horse Guards
  4 April 1931 – 2 November 1935: Colonel of the Governor General's Foot Guards
  4 April 1931 – 2 November 1935: Colonel of the Canadian Grenadier Guards

Honorary degrees
  1932: University of Alberta, Doctor of Laws (LLD)
 : University of Toronto, Doctor of Laws (LLD)
 : University of Ottawa, Doctor of Laws (LLD)
 : McGill University, Doctor of Laws (DCL)

Honorific eponyms

Awards
 : Bessborough Trophy (renamed Calvert Trophy)

Buildings
 : Bessborough Armoury, Vancouver
 : Delta Bessborough, Saskatoon

Schools
 : Bessborough Hall, Clear Water Academy, Calgary
 : Bessborough School, Moncton

Arms

Ancestry

References

External links 

 
 Governor General of Canada: The Earl of Bessborough
 The Canadian Encyclopedia: Vere Brabazon Ponsonby, 9th Earl of Bessborough
 Canadian Governor General Earl of Bessborough visits Britannia Mines September 8th 1932

  
  

1880 births
1956 deaths
British Army personnel of World War I
Military personnel from London
People educated at Harrow School
Alumni of Trinity College, Cambridge
Vere Ponsonby, 9th Earl of Bessborough
Ponsonby, Vere
Ponsonby, Vere
Governors General of Canada
Chevaliers of the Légion d'honneur
Knights of Justice of the Order of St John
Knights Grand Cross of the Order of St Michael and St George
Ponsonby, Vere
Ponsonby, Vere
Ponsonby, Vere
UK MPs who inherited peerages
Chief Scouts of Canada
Royal Buckinghamshire Yeomanry officers
Suffolk Yeomanry officers
Members of the Privy Council of the United Kingdom
Vere
Members of the Parliament of the United Kingdom for Dover
Politics of Cheltenham
People from Stoughton, West Sussex
Earls created by George VI
Earls in the Peerage of the United Kingdom